Saleh Ahmed Pamba (born 16 October 1950) is a Tanzanian CCM politician and Member of Parliament for Pangani constituency since 2010.

References

1950 births
Living people
Chama Cha Mapinduzi MPs
Tanzanian MPs 2010–2015
Karimjee Secondary School alumni
Tanga Secondary School alumni
University of Dar es Salaam alumni